Brachyodus was a genus of anthracothere that lived in Europe during the Early Miocene.

Taxonomy
The type and only species of this genus is B. onoideus. The nominal species "Brachyodus" strategus has been reassigned to Paenanthracotherium based on similarities with P. bergeri. Likewise, the putative Asian species "B." japonicus was referred to Elomeryx by Tsubamoto and Kohno (2011).

Distribution
Fossils of Brachyodus are known from latest early Miocene deposits in Europe.

References 

Anthracotheres
Oligocene even-toed ungulates
Oligocene mammals of Asia
Oligocene mammals of Europe
Prehistoric even-toed ungulate genera